Kalambaste is a village in the Chiplun Block of Ratnagiri district, Maharashtra, India. Its pin code is 415605. 
The village has its own Panchayat Samiti. The nearest railway station is Chiplun.

References

Villages in Ratnagiri district